The beach of Es Trenc close to Campos on the southern coast of Majorca is part of the Natural Area of Special Interest Es Trenc-Salobrar de Campos. The beach is about 10 km long and extends from Sa Ràpita to Colònia de Sant Jordi. The beach has white sand, dunes, with shallow calm water. Es Trenc is the most popular naturist beach in Mallorca, however, many of the visitors do wear swimsuits, the beach is also the most popular Majorca LGBT beach on the island.

Close behind the beach are facilities where Fleur de sel is harvested in the Salinas d'Es Trenc.

References

External links
 Es Trenc beach guide

Beaches of Mallorca
Beaches of the Balearic Islands